Worcestershire County Cricket Club was established on 4 March 1865. The county entered the Minor Counties Championship in 1895 and competed in the competition until 1898, after which it was elevated to first-class status for the 1899 season. It has since played first-class cricket from 1899, List A cricket from 1963 and Twenty20 cricket from 2003, using a different number of home grounds during that time. New Road in Worcester has played host to the club's first home fixtures in all three formats of the game; in first-class cricket in 1899 against Yorkshire; in List A cricket in 1963 against Surrey; and in Twenty20 cricket against Northamptonshire in 2003. Worcestershire have played home matches at twelve grounds, but have played the majority of their home fixtures at New Road, which has also held One Day Internationals.

The twelve grounds that Worcestershire have used for home matches since 1895 are listed below, with statistics complete through to the end of the 2014 season.

Grounds

Minor county
Below is a complete list of grounds used by Worcestershire County Cricket Club in Minor Counties Championship matches before its elevation to first-class status in 1899.

First-class county
Below is a complete list of grounds used by Worcestershire County Cricket Club in first-class, List A and Twenty20 matches following its elevation to first-class status in 1899.

Notes

References

Worcestershire County Cricket Club
Cricket grounds in Worcestershire
Worcestershire
Worcestershire-related lists